Peter Olayinka Oladeji (born 18 November 1995) is a Nigerian professional footballer who plays as a left winger or forward for Slavia Prague and the Nigeria national team. From 1 July 2023, Olajinka will play for Red Star Belgrade.

Club career

Early career
Olayinka started his career with (Baba Boss) in Ibadan before  in January 2012 he joined Bylis in the Kategoria Superiore, where he initially joined the club's under-19s due to being just 17 at the time. He was promoted to the senior team under Agim Canaj during the 2012–13 season, and he made his professional debut on 20 October 2012 in an Kategoria Superiore game against Luftëtari, in which he came on as an 84th-minute substitute for Jetmir Sefa in the 2–0 win. With the departure of Canaj and the arrival of Naci Şensoy as head coach in November, Olayinka received more playing time under Şensoy who showed faith in the young player. He scored his first goal on 3 February 2013 against Teuta an Albanian Cup tie that ended in a 2–2 draw. He scored again month later on 3 March against Laçi in a 3–2 away loss. He scored again in the Albanian Cup in the first leg of the semi-finals against Skënderbeu, scoring the first goal in a 1–1 draw at the Skënderbeu Stadium. He featured in 14 league games during the 2012–13 campaign without scoring, and helped his side narrowly avoid relegation to the Kategoria e Parë, starting 6 games and completing the full 90 minutes on 2 two occasions. He scored three times in the Albanian Cup in 10 appearances, as his side reached the final for the first time in their history. He started up front in the final against Laçi but was substituted off late in extra time, just before Laçi snatch the game through an Emiliano Çela winner in the 119th minute.

Yenicami Ağdelen
Following the end of the 2012–13 season he attracted clubs from both within Albania and abroad, and it was reported that Portuguese club FC Porto offered Bylis €500,000 for his services but the offer was turned down. Olayinka left the club in the summer of 2013, and asked the governing body of football FIFA to release him from his contract with the club, but Bylis also contacted FIFA, who eventually ruled in favour of the club as he was still under contract. Bylis then took up the option to renew his contract, meaning he was unable to play for another club without their permission, but in order to get around this he joined Northern Cypriot club Yenicami Ağdelen for the 2013–14 season as the North Cyprus Süper Lig is not officially recognised by FIFA. He scored 8 league goals in 21 games to help the club win the Süper Lig for the first time in 20 years. He also scored 6 times in 5 Federasyon Kupası games as his side were beaten finalists, taking his goal tally to 14 goals in 26 games for the club.

Skënderbeu
Olayinka had allegedly agreed terms with Kukësi but on 28 August 2014 he agreed terms with reigning Albanian champions Skënderbeu, and was seen as a replacement for Pero Pejić who had recently moved to Kukësi. His transfer to Skënderbeu was heavily disputed by Kukësi and its president Safet Gjici, who also appealed the move to the Albanian Football Association and reported the player to the police. Nonetheless, Olayinka joined up with the rest of the Skënderbeu squad ahead of the 2014–15 season, and he played his first game for the club in a 0–0 away draw at Apolonia on 19 September, where he played the full 90 minutes.

He returned to Albania in August before the start of the 2015–16 Kategoria Superiore, season and rejoined Skënderbeu, where he was allowed to play once again after serving his suspension.

On 12 September 2015, Olayinka scored his first league goals of 2015–16 season against newly promoted side Tërbuni, scoring both goals of 0–2 away win.

Gent
Olayinka signed a three-year deal with K.A.A. Gent for €1.1 million. He joined Czech First League side Dukla Prague on a year-long loan in July 2016.

Slavia Prague

On 21 July 2018, Slavia Prague signed Olayinka on a four-year contract from Gent for €3,200,000.

Red Star Belgrade
In the evening of 9 January 2023, Red Star Belgrade and Olayinka agreed on the transfer, which will become active after the end of Peter's contract with Slavia.

International career
Because of his talent, there were numerous discussions about making Olayinka the first foreign player of the Albania national football team. Olayinka himself said that he was willing to play for Albania if he got the Albanian passport. However, in September 2019, he was nominated for an international friendly match between Nigeria and Brazil.

Personal life
In March 2021 he married Nigerian model Yetunde Barnabas.

Career statistics

Honours
Bylis
Albanian Cup runners-up: 2012–13

Yenicami Ağdelen
Süper Lig: 2013–14
Federasyon Kupası runners-up: 2013–14

Skënderbeu
Kategoria Superiore: 2014–15

Slavia Prague
Czech First League: 2018–19, 2019–20, 2020–21
Czech Cup: 2018–19, 2020–21

References

External links
KTFF profile

1995 births
Living people
Association football forwards
Nigerian footballers
Nigerian expatriate footballers
Nigeria international footballers
Kategoria Superiore players
KF Skënderbeu Korçë players
K.A.A. Gent players
FK Dukla Prague players
S.V. Zulte Waregem players
SK Slavia Prague players
Czech First League players
Belgian Pro League players
Expatriate footballers in Albania
Expatriate footballers in Northern Cyprus
Expatriate footballers in Belgium
Expatriate footballers in the Czech Republic
Nigerian expatriate sportspeople in Albania
Nigerian expatriate sportspeople in Northern Cyprus
Nigerian expatriate sportspeople in Belgium
Nigerian expatriate sportspeople in the Czech Republic
Sportspeople from Ibadan
2021 Africa Cup of Nations players